CSS Huntsville was a Confederate ironclad floating battery built at Selma, Alabama, from 1862 to 1863 during the American Civil War.

History
Huntsville was ordered on May 1, 1862, by the Confederate States Navy.  She was launched at the Confederate Naval Works at Selma on February 7, 1863, and finished in Mobile.  She was finally delivered on August 1, 1863.  She was only partially armored, with the armor plate delivered by the Shelby Iron Company of Shelby, Alabama, and the Atlanta Rolling Mill. She had defective engines that were obtained from a river steamer and an incomplete armament, so was assigned to guard the waters around Mobile.

Huntsville escaped up the Spanish River following the Battle of Mobile Bay on August 5, 1864. The city of Mobile held out another eight months, with the upper portion of Mobile Bay remaining in Confederate hands. The wreck lies where the Spanish River splits off from the Mobile River on the north side of Blakeley Island, just north of Mobile, until being located in 1985.

Notes

References
 
 
 
 
 

 

Ironclad floating batteries of the Confederate States Navy
Alabama in the American Civil War
Ships built in Selma, Alabama
1863 ships
Maritime incidents in April 1865
Scuttled vessels
Shipwrecks of the American Civil War
Shipwrecks of the Alabama coast